Herpetopoma vixumbilicatum is a species of sea snail, a marine gastropod mollusk in the family Chilodontidae.

Description
The size of the shell varies between 3 mm and 6 mm.

Distribution
This marine species occurs off Victoria and Western Australia.

References

External links
 To World Register of Marine Species
 

vixumbilicatum
Gastropods described in 1893